Arbrissel (Gallo: Arbeczèu) is a commune in the Ille-et-Vilaine department in Brittany in northwestern France.

Population

Inhabitants of Arbrissel are called Arbrisselois in French.

Personalities
Robert of Arbrissel, the founder of the Abbey of Fontevrault, was born in Arbrissel.

See also
Communes of the Ille-et-Vilaine department

References

External links

Mayors of Ille-et-Vilaine Association 

Communes of Ille-et-Vilaine